{{Infobox university
 | image_name             = Mardin Artuklu University logo.svg
 | name                   = Mardin Artuklu University's''
 | native_name            = 
 | motto                  = 
 | established            = 2007 | type                   = 
 | calendar               = 
 | endowment              = 
 | staff                  = 
 | faculty                = 
 | president              = 
 | provost                = 
 | principal              = 
 | rector                 = 
 | chancellor             = 
 | vice_chancellor        = 
 | dean                   = 
 | head_label             = 
 | head                   = 
 | students               = 
 | undergrad              = 
 | postgrad               = 
 | doctoral               = 
 | city                   = Mardin
 | state                  = 
 | country                = Turkey
 | campus                 = 
 | free_label             = 
 | free                   = 
 | athletics              = 
 | colors                 = 
 | mascot                 = 
 | nickname               = 
 | affiliations           = 
 | footnotes              = 
 | website                = 
 | address                = 
 | telephone              = 
 | coor                   = 
 | logo                   = 
}}Mardin Artuklu University''' (MAU) is a university located in Mardin, Turkey. It was established in 2007.

Language programs
In 2009, the university was allowed to open a Kurdish language department by the Higher Education Board. Before, the Kurdish language was banned for long periods of time in Turkey. In 2011 the MAU was the first university to have a Kurdish language and literature department. By 2014 about 900 students have graduated in Kurdish language department. The university has also had a professor for the Zaza language since 2020.

References

External links
Official Website

 
Universities and colleges in Turkey
Educational institutions established in 2007
State universities and colleges in Turkey
2007 establishments in Turkey
Mardin